Gong Runbo (6 July 1973 – 31 December 2006) was a Chinese serial killer who, between March 2005 and February 2006, murdered at least six children between the ages of 9 and 16. Forensic evidence led police to believe he may have killed over twenty.

Gong was imprisoned in October 1996 for the rape of a 15-year-old girl. He was released in 2004 after serving an eight-year sentence. He sexually assaulted and murdered six children in the city of Jiamusi, in northeast China's Heilongjiang Province. He also lured and molested five others aged 12 and 13.

Gong was arrested on February 28, 2006 when a boy escaped from his apartment and called the police. The police captured Gong in a nearby Internet cafe and found four decomposing bodies and children's clothes in his apartment. He was executed on 31 December 2006.

See also
List of serial killers by country
List of serial killers by number of victims

References

External links
Notorious serial killer sentenced to death in NE. China - China Daily.
Man charged with child murders after controversial probe  - The Chinese Central Government's Official Web Portal.

1972 births
2004 crimes in China
2006 deaths
2006 murders in China
20th-century Chinese criminals
21st-century Chinese criminals
21st-century executions by China
Child abuse incidents and cases
Child sexual abuse in China
Chinese male criminals
Chinese murderers of children
Chinese people convicted of child sexual abuse
Chinese rapists
Executed Chinese serial killers
Executed People's Republic of China people
Male serial killers
People executed by China by firearm
People convicted of murder by the People's Republic of China
Violence against children